Iestyn is a masculine given name. Notable people with the name include:

Iestyn (saint), Welsh saint of the 6th or 7th centuries
Justinian of Ramsey Island, 6th-century hermit
Iestyn Davies, British opera singer
Iestyn ap Gwrgant (1045–1093), the last ruler of the Welsh kingdom of Morgannwg
Iestyn Edwards, stage and TV writer/performer, published poet and journalist
Iestyn Harris (born 1976), Welsh professional rugby league footballer
Iestyn Thomas (born 1976), Welsh rugby union footballer
Rhydderch ap Iestyn (died 1033), king of Gwent and Morgannwg in south Wales

Welsh masculine given names